The Diquis culture (sometimes spelled Diquís) was a pre-Columbian indigenous culture of Costa Rica that flourished from AD 700 to 1530. The word "diquís" means "great waters" or "great river" in the Boruca language. The Diquis formed part of the Greater Chiriqui culture that spanned from southern Costa Rica to western Panama.

The Diquis are known for stone spheres, sometimes referred to as the Diquís Spheres, an assortment of over three hundred petrospheres in Costa Rica, located on the Diquis Delta and on Isla del Caño. Sites where the stone spheres were found also contain artificial mounds, paved areas, and burial sites.

See also
 Stone spheres of Costa Rica

References

External links

The Art of Precolumbian Gold: The Jan Mitchell Collection, an exhibition catalog from The Metropolitan Museum of Art (available online as PDF), which contains material on Diquis culture 

Pre-Columbian cultures
History of Costa Rica